The Diving Competition for men and women at the 2003 Pan American Games was held from August 6 to August 10, 2003 in Santo Domingo, Dominican Republic. There were four events each for men and women, after the inclusion of the Synchronized Springboard and Synchronized Platform events.

Men's competition

3m Springboard
Held on Thursday August 7

10m Platform
Held on Saturday August 9

3m Synchronized Springboard

10m Synchronized Platform
Held on Friday August 8

Women's competition

3m Springboard
Held on Friday August 8

10m Platform

3m Springboard Synchronized
Held on Sunday August 10

10m Synchronized Platform
Held on Thursday August 7

Medal table

See also
 Diving at the 2004 Summer Olympics

References

 Sports 123
 Results
 usadiver

2003
2003 in diving
Events at the 2003 Pan American Games